The HDF Land Command (Hungarian: MH Szárazföldi Parancsnokság) is the leading organization of the Hungarian Defence Forces Ground Force, which operates under the direct command of the Army General Staff. It plans and directs the refueling, equipment, supplies, infrastructure, maintenance and development of the Ground Forces, as well as the preparation, redeployment, deployment, national support and rotation of military organizations involved in peacekeeping operations. Its headquarters are located at Székesfehérvár.

Its original legal predecessor, Headquarters 5th Army, was established on 3 August 1961 in Budapest. A year later it was relocated to Székesfehérvár. It started operating under difficult conditions, only Second World War obsolete technical equipment was available and it was plagued by material shortages. The staff consisted of young officers and non-commissioned officers.

In 1991, the 5th Army Command became the Land Forces Command. Later name changes included:
 1991–1994: Land Forces Command
 1994–1997: 4. Mechanized Corps Command
 1997–2001: MH Land General Staff
 2001: MH Land Command

Formations in the 1960s 

Hungarian divisions were patterned after the Soviet model; by the early 1980s, they were motorised to the extent that there was sufficient transport to carry all personnel when the division moved.

 4th Motor Rifle Division (Hungary) (Gyöngyös)
 7th Motor Rifle Division (Hungary) (Kiskunfélegyháza)
 8th Motor Rifle Division (Hungary) (Zalaegerszeg)
 9th Motor Rifle Division (Hungary) (Kaposvár)
 15th Motor Rifle Division (Hungary) (Nyíregyháza)
 11th Tank Division (Hungary) (Tata)

In November 1966, the 3rd Mechanized Corps was established in the Dózsa György Barracks at Cegléd. This corps was to oversee second-stage formations of lower readiness.

In 1987, the 5th Army included the 5th Missile Brigade (Tapolca, Hungary); the 37th Pontoon Regiment (Ercsi); the 60th Engineer Brigade (Szeged); the 15th Pontoon Regiment (Szentes); the 123rd Technical Engineer Regiment (Orosháza); the 93rd independent Chemical Defence Regiment (Kiskőrös); the 75th Medical Regiment (Nagykanizsa); the 87th Combat Helicopter Regiment (Szentkirályszabadja) with Mil Mi-8 and Mi-24; the 3rd Corps, with its headquarters still at Cegled; and the 7th, 8th, 9th Motor Rifle and 11th (Tank) Divisions.

The 87th Regiment began as the 86th Composite Aircraft Squadron in Kecskemet. In 1969 it relocated to Szentkirályszabadja. In 1973 the Tactical Aviation Command (CsRP) was formed (until then all air assets other than training were subordinated to the National Air Defence Command (OLP)). In 1973, with the reorganization of air units, the 86th Composite Air Squadron was upgraded into the 87th Transport Helicopter Regiment. In 1984 its name changed to Combat Helicopter Regiment when the second Mi-24 squadron was added. Until 1987 it was a by-the-book Soviet army-level combat helicopter regiment. Then a fourth squadron was added – a command and EW squadron of Mi-17, Mi-9 (the flying command post variant) and Mi-17PPA.

Formations from 2001 
 HDF 5th Bocskai István Infantry Brigade
 HDF 25th Klapka György Light Rifle Brigade
 HDF 11th Hunyadi Mátyás Tank Battalion
 HDF 37th II. Ferenc Rákóczi Technical Brigade
 HDF 24th Gornely Bornemissza Reconnaissance Battalion (see :hu:MH 24. Bornemissza Gergely Felderítő Ezred)
 HDF 34th Bercsényi László Special Forces Battalion
 93rd Sándor Petőfi Chemical Defense Battalion
 HDF 5th Electronics-Fighting Company (electronic warfare company?)
 64th Boconádi Szabó József Logistics Regiment
 MH 43rd Leadership Support Battalion
 HDF Bakony Fighting Training Center

Formations as of 2020 
1st Explosive Ordnance Disposal and River Flotilla Regiment "Honvéd", at Újpest military port in Budapest
2nd Special Forces Brigade "vitéz Árpád Bertalan", in Szolnok Air Base
5th Infantry Brigade "István Bocskai", in Debrecen
24th Reconnaissance Regiment "Gergely Bornemissza" in Debrecen
25th Infantry Brigade "György Klapka", in Tata
37th Engineer Regiment "Ferenc Rákóczi II", in Szentes
43rd Signal and Command Support Regiment "József Nagysándor", in Székesfehérvár
93rd CBRN defense Battalion "Sándor Petőfi", in Székesfehérvár

See also 
 Structure of the Hungarian Defence Forces

References

Further reading 
Balla Tibor-Csikány Tamás-Gulyás Géza-Horváth Csaba-Kovács Vilmos: A magyar tüzérség 100 éve, 1913–2013, Budapest Zrínyi Kiadó, 2014, 

Military units and formations of Hungary